Homi may refer to:

People
 Homi Adajania
 Homi Billimoria, Ceylonese architect
 Homi F. Daji
 Homi J. Bhabha (1909–1966), Indian nuclear physicist
 Homi J. H. Taleyarkhan
 Homi K. Bhabha
 Homi Kharas, British economist
 Homi Maneck Mehta (1871–1948), Indian industrialist
 Homi Master
 Homi Mobed
 Homi Mody
 Homi Motivala (born 1958), Indian sportsperson
 Homi Mullan (1940–2015), Indian percussionist
 Homi Pithawalla or Homer Pithawalla
 Homi Powri (born 1922), Indian cyclist
 Homi Sethna (1923–2010), Indian nuclear scientist
 Homi Wadia (1911–2004), Indian film director and producer in Bollywood (Hindi cinema)

Places
 Homi Station, Japan
 Homi Villa, also known as Airport Core Programme Exhibition Centre

Other
 Homi (tool), Korean hand plow